Eva Karel is a former Swiss slalom canoeist who competed from the mid-1960s to the mid-1970s. She won a silver medal in the K-1 team event at the 1973 ICF Canoe Slalom World Championships in Muotathal.

References

Swiss female canoeists
Living people
Year of birth missing (living people)
Medalists at the ICF Canoe Slalom World Championships